Corythaica is a genus of eggplant tingids in the family Tingidae. There are more than 20 described species in Corythaica.

Species
These 24 species belong to the genus Corythaica:

 Corythaica acuta (Drake, 1917)
 Corythaica bellula Torre-Bueno, 1917
 Corythaica bosqi Monte, 1938
 Corythaica caestri (Reed, 1900)
 Corythaica carinata Uhler, 1894
 Corythaica constricta Osborn & Drake
 Corythaica costata Gibson, 1919
 Corythaica cucullata (Berg, 1879)
 Corythaica cyathicollis (Costa, 1864)
 Corythaica cytharina (Butler, 1877)
 Corythaica darwiniana Drake & Froeschner, 1967
 Corythaica dellapei Montemayor & Melo, 2012
 Corythaica globifera
 Corythaica leprosa Montemayor & Melo, 2012
 Corythaica misionera Ajmat, 2000
 Corythaica monacha (Stål, 1858)
 Corythaica passiflorae (Berg, 1884)
 Corythaica pavonia Ajmat, 2000
 Corythaica planaris Uhler, 1893
 Corythaica saltensis Montemayor & Melo, 2012
 Corythaica smithi Drake, 1921
 Corythaica umbrosa (Monte, 1938)
 Corythaica venusta (Champion, 1898)
 Corythaica wolfiana Drake & Froeschner, 1967

References

Further reading

 
 
 
 

Tingidae
Articles created by Qbugbot